Swanand Kirkire (Marathi: स्वानंद किरकिरे; born 29 April 1972) is an Indian lyricist, playback singer, writer, assistant director, actor and dialogue writer, both in television with Marathi and Hindi films.

Kirkire won the National Film Award for Best Lyrics twice: first in 2006 for the song "Bande Me Tha Dum...Vande Mataram" from the film Lage Raho Munna Bhai, and then in 2009, for the song "Behti Hawa Sa Tha Woh" from the film 3 Idiots. He received Filmfare Award nomination for Best Lyrics for the song "Piyu Bole" in Parineeta (2005). In 2018, at the 66th National Film Awards he won the National Film Award for Best Supporting Actor for the Marathi film Chumbak.

Early life and education
Swanand Kirkire was born and brought up at Rambagh in Indore-based Marathi speaking family to Chintamani (father) and Neelambari (mother), both of whom are classical singers. However, Swanand had no formal training in singing.

He moved to Delhi after doing his graduation in commerce. In 1996, Swanand graduated from National School of Drama and started doing theatre.

Filmography

As lyricist

As playback singer

As music director

As Actor

Web series

As dialogue writer

As associate director

Awards

References

External links

 
 Swanand Kirkire filmography Bollywood Hungama

1970 births
Living people
Marathi people
Male actors in Hindi cinema
Indian male playback singers
Hindi-language lyricists
National School of Drama alumni
Male actors from Indore
21st-century Indian male actors
Singers from Madhya Pradesh
Bollywood playback singers
Musicians from Indore
21st-century Indian singers
Best Lyrics National Film Award winners
21st-century Indian male singers
Best Supporting Actor National Film Award winners